GTE mainStreet, also known as mainStreet USA, was one of the first interactive television projects.

Internet style content was available through this television service before the internet was widely accessible. mainStreet started in the mid-1980s and matured technically with rich new content from 1990 to 1998. The explosive popularity of Netscape and the World Wide Web in the late 1990s made mainStreet obsolete. The product worked via a set-top box and utilised the local cable television provider's infrastructure and the customer's telephone line.

See also
 GTE

References

External links
GTE mainStreet (Web Archive)

History of the Internet
Products introduced in the 1980s
Products and services discontinued in 1998
1980s establishments in the United States
Categort:1998 disestablishments in the United States